Kommerell or Commerell is a German surname. Notable people with the surname include:

 Blanche Kommerell (born 1950), German actress and writer
 Max Kommerell (1902–1944), German literary historian, writer, and poet
 John Edmund Commerell
 William Commerell

German-language surnames